Mark Cullen (born 21 April 1992) is an English professional footballer who plays as a striker for  club AFC Fylde. A player with excellent finishing skills, he has scored in each of the top five divisions of the English football league system.

A former Newcastle United youth-team player, he went on to graduate from the Hull City Academy and make his Premier League debut for the club in the 2009–10 season. He spent the next three seasons on loan at Bradford City, Bury and Stockport County, before taking a free transfer move to Luton Town in May 2013. Luton won promotion back into the English Football League as champions of the Conference Premier at the end of the 2013–14 season and he was sold on to Blackpool for a fee of £180,000 in June 2015 after a successful season in League Two. Blackpool were relegated from League One the next year, but secured an immediate promotion after Cullen scored the winning goal in the 2017 League Two play-off Final. He then struggled with injuries over the next two years, spending time on loan at Carlisle United, before he was allowed to move on to Port Vale in June 2019. He spent two seasons at the Vale though struggled for first-team appearances and moved on to Hartlepool United in August 2021. He then signed permanently for National League North side AFC Fylde six months later.

Career

Hull City
Born in Ashington, Northumberland, Cullen spent his early years with Newcastle United's youth academy before being released at the age of 14. He joined the Hull City youth system on a two-year scholarship in June 2008. He made his first-team debut as a 67th-minute substitute for Kamel Ghilas in a 4–1 defeat to Wigan Athletic in the FA Cup third round on 2 January 2010. Cullen was given a place in the team after scoring 27 goals for the youth team in the 2009–10 season. Cullen made his Premier League debut on 24 April, when he came on as a substitute for George Boateng in the 75th-minute of a 1–0 defeat to Sunderland at the KC Stadium. He scored his first goal in senior football in his first start for the club, in a 2–2 draw at Wigan on 3 May. He then went on to start in Hull's last game of the 2009–10 season, a 0–0 home draw with Liverpool.

Cullen scored his second and final goal for Hull in a 2–1 League Cup second round defeat by Brentford on 24 August 2010. He made 17 Championship appearances in the 2010–11 season and in January 2011, Cullen, along with fellow youth team graduate Tom Cairney, signed a new contract with the club until the summer of 2013. A few days later, Cullen joined League Two club Bradford City on a one-month loan; manager Peter Taylor had originally enquired about Cullen the previous year but at the time instead opted to sign Ryan Kendall. He played four games for Bradford before returning to Hull.

At the start of the 2011–12 season, Cullen was loaned to League One club Bury for six months. However he made only four appearances for Bury before returning to Hull in January 2012. He featured in four Championship games for Hull in the month of March, but was otherwise absent from Nick Barmby's first-team plans. On 7 August 2012, Cullen returned to Bury for a further loan period on the same day that manager Richie Barker left Gigg Lane to manage Crawley Town. He played in 12 games, scoring once in a 2–2 draw with Stevenage. His loan spell was brought to an end on 18 October following a shin injury. On 31 January 2013, Cullen went out on a month-long loan to Stockport County in the Conference Premier. This was later extended until the end of the 2012–13 season. Cullen scored two goals in a 2–0 win over Barrow on 12 March. He scored a total of four goals in 16 games at Edgeley Park as Ian Bogie's side were relegated to the Conference North. In contrast, Hull won promotion back to the Premier League at the end of the season, however manager Steve Bruce allowed Cullen to leave on a free transfer after deciding not to offer the 21-year old a new contract.

Luton Town
On 17 May 2013, Cullen signed for Conference Premier club Luton Town on a two-year contract. He scored his first goals for the club in a 3–2 win over Lincoln City on 21 September. Cullen was primarily used as a substitute for much of the 2013–14 season as the goalscoring form of Andre Gray and Paul Benson kept him out of the starting lineup. He came on as a substitute against Cambridge United to score what the Luton News called a 90th minute "stunning" equaliser that kept Luton 15 points clear of their nearest title rivals on 11 March. Cullen regained a place in the starting line-up towards the end of the season, scoring three goals in five games as Luton won promotion to League Two. Cullen played 36 times and scored 10 goals in all competitions during the season, and in May 2014, he signed a new three-year contract to keep him at Kenilworth Road until the end of 2016–17.

Cullen was promoted to a regular starting place in the team for the 2014–15 season after Luton sold Andre Gray. He was named as League Two Player of the Month for October after scoring five goals, including a "perfect hat-trick" – scoring with his head, left foot and right foot – in a 3–1 victory over Dagenham & Redbridge. However manager John Still revealed that the striker had expressed a wish to leave the club in February and an unnamed club made an approach to take him in on loan. Cullen stated that he wished to play at a higher level and also wanted to move further north to be closer to his family. He played in 47 games in all competitions, scoring 14 goals to end the campaign as Luton's top-scorer.

Blackpool
On 30 June 2015, Cullen signed for League One club Blackpool on a three-year deal, who paid Luton a transfer fee of £180,000. Manager Neil McDonald said that "he's an inter-link player who can go in behind and has said he will even play wide if he needs to" and set him a target of 20 goals for the upcoming campaign. Cullen scored both of his side's goals in a 2–2 draw with Colchester United on his debut on 8 August. He ended the 2015–16 season as the club's top-scorer with nine goals in 43 games and Blackpool were relegated down to League Two. He scored 13 goals from 40 appearances in the 2016–17 campaign, again leaving him as the club's top-scorer; this tally included a hat-trick against former club Luton Town in the first leg of the play-off semi-finals at Bloomfield Road. Blackpool eliminated Luton and Cullen went on to score the winning goal as Blackpool beat Exeter City 2–1 in the League Two play-off final at Wembley Stadium.

He was restricted to just nine appearances in the 2017–18 season after undergoing surgery to resolve a hamstring injury. He signed a new one-year contract with Blackpool in May 2018, with the club retaining the option of a further year. However he suffered a stress fracture on his leg in November. He joined League Two club Carlisle United on 28 January 2019 on loan until the end of the 2018–19 season. Carlisle manager Steven Pressley said that Cullen rejected the chance to join a League One club in order to go to Brunton Park, but admitted that the striker was still two weeks away from full fitness. He made his first start for Carlisle at Colchester United on 23 February, and Pressley said that the side was weakened after he was taken off for fitness reasons on 69 minutes. His injury problems continued after he suffered a tear in his groin, which kept him out of action for six weeks. He ended his loan spell without scoring in three starts and six substitute appearances. He left Blackpool after manager Terry McPhillips opted not to take up the option to extend Cullen's contract by a further 12 months; he was the club's longest-serving player at the time of his departure. He was linked with a return to Bradford City, who were managed by former Blackpool boss Gary Bowyer.

Port Vale
On 26 June 2019, Cullen signed a one-year contract with League Two club Port Vale. He described the move as a "fresh start" following a long spell struggling with injuries as the club entered a new era with new owners in Carol and Kevin Shanahan, and a new manager in John Askey. He scored in his first start at Vale Park, converting from the penalty spot in a 2–1 defeat to Burton Albion in the EFL Cup on 13 August. He found first-team opportunities limited at the start of the 2019–20 season, but nevertheless boasted a record of four goals from four starts and six substitute appearances after a brace against Newcastle United U21 in the EFL Trophy on 12 November. He again dropped down the pecking order, before replacing a suspended Tom Pope to score a brace in a 3–0 home win over Colchester United on 15 February to earn himself a place on the EFL team of the week. He signed a new one-year contract after he ended the campaign with eight goals in 25 appearances.

Cullen opened the 2020–21 league season on 12 September by scoring both goals in a 2–0 home victory over Crawley Town. However he struggled with ankle, calf and knee injuries at various points throughout the campaign. New manager Darrell Clarke named Cullen as one of 15 players to be released from the club in May 2021.

Hartlepool United
He spent July 2021 on trial at newly-promoted League Two club Hartlepool United and impressed manager Dave Challinor. On 1 August 2021, Cullen signed a contract of undisclosed length with Hartlepool despite picking up an injury in a pre-season friendly with Spennymoor Town during the trial period. He made his Hartlepool debut as a late substitute in a 1–0 victory against Crawley Town on the opening day of the 2021–22 season. On 19 October, Cullen marked his full league debut for "Pools" with a brace in a 3–1 victory at former club Bradford City. He scored six goals in 27 games for the club, but asked to leave Victoria Park as he fell down the pecking order after Marcus Carver and Omar Bogle were signed during the January transfer window.

AFC Fylde
On 22 February 2022, Cullen signed an 18-month contract with AFC Fylde of the National League North after joining on a free transfer; manager Jim Bentley admitted that "I have tried to sign him on a few occasions in the past". Having played as a substitute in a defeat to Darlington at Mill Farm later that day, he marked his full debut four days later with a goal in a 2–0 win at Blyth Spartans. However he ruptured his Anterior cruciate ligament during his fourth appearance for the "Coasters" and was ruled out for the rest of the 2021–22 season.

Style of play
Stockport County assistant manager Stuart Watkiss described Cullen as "an out-and-out goalscorer" whose "finishing is the best part of his game". He also possesses good movement and close ball control skills.

Career statistics

Honours
Luton Town
Conference Premier: 2013–14

Blackpool
EFL League Two play-offs: 2017

Individual
Football League Two Player of the Month: October 2014

References

1992 births
Living people
Sportspeople from Ashington
Footballers from Northumberland
English footballers
Association football forwards
Newcastle United F.C. players
Hull City A.F.C. players
Bradford City A.F.C. players
Bury F.C. players
Stockport County F.C. players
Luton Town F.C. players
Blackpool F.C. players
Carlisle United F.C. players
Port Vale F.C. players
Hartlepool United F.C. players
AFC Fylde players
Premier League players
English Football League players
National League (English football) players